The 2013 NBL Canada Draft was held on August 19, 2013, at Hilton Suites Conference Centre & Spa in Markham, Ontario. A total of 29 players were selected, in three rounds. Alex Johnson was selected with the first overall pick by the Ottawa SkyHawks, becoming the first Canadian to be the top pick in the NBL Canada Draft. Johnson did not appear for the SkyHawks, as he was traded to the Mississauga Power for Bol Kong.

Draft

References

National Basketball League of Canada Draft
Draft
NL Canada draft
NBL Canada draft
Basketball in Ontario
Events in Ontario
Sport in Markham, Ontario